is a female wrestler from Japan.

External links 
 bio on fila-wrestling.com

Japanese female sport wrestlers
Living people
1988 births

World Wrestling Championships medalists
Asian Wrestling Championships medalists
21st-century Japanese women